"Heart of Steel" is a two-part episode of Batman: The Animated Series, the thirty-eighth and thirty-ninth produced, dealing with a supercomputer named H.A.R.D.A.C. and its attempts to replace Gotham citizens with robotic duplicates before initiating an AI takeover. These were the first Batman scripts to be written by Brynne Stephens, who wrote a total of 7 episodes. The episodes were directed by series regular Kevin Altieri, and originally aired on November 16 and 17, 1992.

Plot

Part 1

The episode begins with a woman leaving a briefcase behind, seemingly deliberately, at Wayne Enterprises. That night, it grows a camera and a set of mechanical limbs and makes its way to the research and development department. Once there it produces a laser cutter and breaks into a safe, where it begins stealing microchips. An alarm goes off, alerting Bruce, who changes into his Batman costume and investigates. He struggles with the robot, eventually chasing it to the roof, where it fires a rocket with the microchips into the sky. Batman takes a hang glider from a rooftop storage unit and pursues it until it is recovered by the woman from the beginning of the episode, who is able to shoot down the glider and escape.

The next day, Bruce begins to investigate the stolen microchips. He tells Alfred these microchips are a technology called 'wetware', the first stage in the development of computers with intuition and a will of their own, and among the most advanced in the world. Lucius Fox tells him that the only other company who could compete with Wayne Enterprises in that field is Cybertron Industries, run by the reclusive Karl Rossum (voiced by William Sanderson, who played the genetic designer J.F. Sebastian in Blade Runner, as a tributary nod to that film and its replicants, which are genetically engineered organic robots). Bruce goes out to Cybertron to meet Rossum, who shows him a giant, prototype supercomputer called H.A.R.D.A.C. (a tribute to the HAL 9000 computer A.I. of 2001: A Space Odyssey, replete with a large red television camera "eye", reminiscent of that classic film), as well as introducing him to his assistant, Randa Duane. Unable to find out more, Bruce makes a date with Randa and leaves. Once he is gone Duane speaks to H.A.R.D.A.C., who scolds her not getting design specifications that it needed. H.A.R.D.A.C. is then shown building a humanlike robot, its face is not revealed but Randa reveals herself to be the woman.

At the Gordon residence, Barbara Gordon is doing her homework while Commissioner Gordon reads the newspaper. The doorbell rings and a robot version of Gordon appears, tasering him unconscious and attempting to replace him, though Barbara is immediately suspicious. In the meantime, Randa picks Bruce up from Wayne Enterprises and they go to Wayne Manor, though she manages to leave her makeup compact behind. Like the briefcase before it, the compact grows legs and begins stealing files from a computer. When Bruce is alerted to the theft he abruptly leaves his date with Randa, who is likewise alerted by H.A.R.D.A.C. that the theft has been unsuccessful, and that the files that it wants are at Wayne Manor. She knocks Alfred unconscious and, using specialized goggles, locates the Batcave and informs H.A.R.D.A.C. of the fact that Batman is Bruce Wayne.

Bruce returns home, discovers the unconscious Alfred, and immediately dons his Batman costume and proceeds to the Batcave. When he attempts to use the Batcomputer it goes haywire, and suddenly the mechanical arms which previously supported his hang glider descend upon him, dragging him up into the darkness while screaming.

Part 2
Barbara soon discovers something's wrong with her father. She turns to Batman, who broke free from the mechanical arms. Bullock appears and fights with the Dark Knight. Batman fights back and pushes him against the bat signal. It is revealed that Bullock is an android and that the real Bullock has been kidnapped. Batman leaves to find Gordon and Bullock at Cybertron Industries. Barbara decides to go to Cybertron Industries to find and save her father on her own. Meanwhile, Batman frees Bullock and Gordon but is intervened by a robot run by H.A.R.D.A.C.. Barbara arrives at Cybertron Industries, but a robot captures her and takes her to the supercomputer. Batman manages to free himself and fights the robots only when he is stopped by H.A.R.D.A.C. who activates the detonations program. Batman and the others manage to get out just in time before the whole place is blown up.

Trivia

The name 'Rossum' refers to R.U.R. (Rossum's Universal Robots), a Czech play by Karel Čapek, where the term 'robot' was first coined. Randa is seen driving a car early in the first episode with the license number 'RUR'.

Karl Rossum himself is modeled on the Blade Runner character of J.F. Sebastian, also played by William Sanderson and also a roboticist. In this storyline, the fake humans are called "duplicants;" while in Blade Runner, they were called "replicants."

Reception

The A.V. Club gave the episode an A−, singling out the depiction of Barbara Gordon as being particularly strong.

References

External links
 
 

1992 American television episodes
Batman: The Animated Series episodes
Television episodes about androids
Television episodes about artificial intelligence
Television episodes about abduction